Labeobarbus mariae is a species of cyprinid fish.

It is endemic to Lower Guinea, found in the Wouri and Sanaga River basins.

References

Endemic fauna of Cameroon
mariae
Cyprinid fish of Africa
Fish described in 1926
Taxonomy articles created by Polbot
Taxobox binomials not recognized by IUCN